Duang Jai Akkanee is a 2010 Thai lakorn 1 in 4 drama series 4 Hua Jai Haeng Khun Khao (4 Hearts of the Mountain) that is aired on Channel 3 (Thailand). It starred Nadech Kugimiya and Urassaya Sperbund.

Plot
Because of the conflict between 2 families from the fathers' generation, Akkanee and Ajjima have been enemies with each other since they were kids. When they grow up and take care of their own dairy farm which there is the white fence as a border, the quarrel and fight often happens between them. However, under their harshness against each other, they secretly care about each other.

Later, when many incidents lead them to open their hearts to each other, they have to face the big barrier. Ajjima's father is still stubborn and does not accept this son-in-law-to-be. Can Akkanee get through the barrier?

Cast

Main cast
 Nadech Kugimiya (Barry) as Akkanee (Fai) Adisuan
 Urassaya Sperbund (Yaya) as Ajjima (Jeed) Potsawat
 Prin Suparat (Mark) as Pathapee (Din) Adisuan
 Pakorn Chatborirak (Boy) as Wayupak (Lom) Adisuan

Supporting Cast
 Metanee Buranasiri as Pisarn Potsawat
 Krerk Chiller as P'Noo-Tor
 Chokchai Boonworametee (Boy) as Sila Potsawat
 Panthila Fooklin (Air) as Pimnapa (Peemai)
 Jirayu Tantragool (Got) as Yai
 Benjapol Cheoyarun (Golf) as Sak
 Santisuk Promsiri (Noom) as Montree Adisuan 
 Jintara Sukapat (Mam) as Supansa Adisuan 
 Ronadech Wongsaroj (Naem) as Preuk
 Sumolthip Leungurai (Kubkib) as Pachanee (Milk)
 Kluay Chern-Yim as Pong
 Panomkorn Tungtatsawat (San) as Kraipope (Krai)

Special appearances 
 Kimberly Ann Voltemas as Tipthara "Nam" Adisuan-Rajaput (2 episodes)
 Chalida Vijitvongthong as Cha-Aim Vongvanitsakunkit (12 episode)
 waranya leartkredtrakon as Meena

Awards and nominations

References

External links

 

Channel 3 (Thailand) original programming
Thai television soap operas
2010 Thai television series debuts
2010 Thai television series endings
2010s Thai television series